Jose Crisologo Sorra (9 March 1929 – 21 January 2021) was a Filipino Roman Catholic bishop.

Sorra was born in Malinao, Albay in the Philippines and was ordained to the priesthood in 1956. He served as bishop of the Roman Catholic Diocese of Virac from 1974 to 1993 and as bishop of the Roman Catholic Diocese of Legazpi from 1993 to 2005. Upon his retirement, Sorra moved to Bacacay in a retreat center called Bethlehem. He died due to respiratory failure on January 21, 2021 in Legazpi.

Notes

1929 births
2021 deaths
20th-century Roman Catholic bishops in the Philippines
People from Albay
21st-century Roman Catholic bishops in the Philippines